The 1977–78 Nationalliga A season was the 40th season of the Nationalliga A, the top level of ice hockey in Switzerland. Eight teams participated in the league, and EHC Biel won the championship.

Standings

External links
 Championnat de Suisse 1977/78

Swiss
National League (ice hockey) seasons
1977–78 in Swiss ice hockey